This is a list of electoral divisions and wards in the ceremonial county of Durham in North East England. All changes since the re-organisation of local government following the passing of the Local Government Act 1972 are shown. The number of councillors elected for each electoral division or ward is shown in brackets.

Current councils

Durham
This is about the area covered by the former non-metropolitan county and its successor unitary authority.

Electoral Divisions from 1 April 1974 (first election 12 April 1973) to 7 May 1981:

Electoral Divisions from 7 May 1981 to 5 May 2005:

Electoral Divisions from 5 May 2005 to 2 May 2013:

All Electoral Divisions were changed to (2) in 2008

Electoral Divisions from 2 May 2013 to present:

Darlington
Wards from 1 April 1974 (first election 7 June 1973) to 3 May 1979:

Wards from 3 May 1979 to 1 May 2003:

Wards from 1 May 2003 to 7 May 2015:

Wards from 7 May 2015 to present:

Hartlepool
Wards from 1 April 1974 (first election 7 June 1973) to 6 May 1976:

Wards from 6 May 1976 to 10 June 2004:

Wards from 10 June 2004 to 3 May 2012:

Wards from 3 May 2012 to 6 May 2021:

Wards from 6 May 2021 to present:

Stockton-on-Tees
Wards from 1 April 1974 (first election 7 June 1973) to 3 May 1979:

Wards from 3 May 1979 to 5 May 2005:

Wards from 5 May 2005 to present:

Former councils

Cleveland
Electoral Divisions from 1 April 1974 (first election 12 April 1973) to 2 May 1985:

Electoral Divisions from 2 May 1985 to 1 April 1996 (county abolished):

Chester-le-Street
Wards from 1 April 1974 (first election 7 June 1973) to 3 May 1979:

Wards from 3 May 1979 to 1 May 2003:

Wards from 1 May 2003 to 1 April 2009 (district abolished):

Derwentside
Wards from 1 April 1974 (first election 7 June 1973) to 3 May 1979:

Wards from 3 May 1979 to 1 May 2003:

Wards from 1 May 2003 to 1 April 2009 (district abolished):

Durham
Wards from 1 April 1974 (first election 7 June 1973) to 3 May 1979:

Wards from 3 May 1979 to 1 May 2003:

Wards from 1 May 2003 to 1 April 2009 (district abolished):

Easington
Wards from 1 April 1974 (first election 7 June 1973) to 3 May 1979:

Wards from 3 May 1979 to 1 May 2003:

Wards from 1 May 2003 to 1 April 2009 (district abolished):

Sedgefield
Wards from 1 April 1974 (first election 7 June 1973) to 5 May 1983:

Wards from 5 May 1983 to 1 May 2003:

Wards from 1 May 2003 to 1 April 2009 (district abolished):

Teesdale
Wards from 1 April 1974 (first election 7 June 1973) to 5 May 1983:

Wards from 5 May 1983 to 1 May 2003:

Wards from 1 May 2003 to 1 April 2009 (district abolished):

Wear Valley
Wards from 1 April 1974 (first election 7 June 1973) to 5 May 1983:

Wards from 5 May 1983 to 1 May 2003:

Wards from 1 May 2003 to 1 April 2009 (district abolished):

Electoral wards by constituency

Bishop Auckland
Barnard Castle East, Barnard Castle North, Barnard Castle West, Bishop Auckland Town, Barningham and Ovington, Byerley, Cockfield, Cockton Hill, Cotherstone with Lartington, Coundon, Dene Valley, Eggleston, Escomb, Etherley, Evenwood, Gainford and Winston, Greta, Hamsterley and South Bedburn, Henknowle, Ingleton, Lynesack, Low Spennymoor and Tudhoe Grange, Middlestone, Middleton-in-Teesdale, Ramshaw and Lands, Romaldkirk, Spennymoor, Startforth, Streatlam and Whorlton, Sunnydale, Thickley, Tudhoe. West Auckland, Woodhouse Close.

City of Durham
Bearpark and Witton Gilbert, Belmont, Brancepeth, Langley Moor and Meadowfield, Brandon, Carrville and Gilesgate Moor, Cassop-cum-Quarrington, Coxhoe, Crossgate and Framwelgate, Deerness, Elvet, Framwellgate Moor, Neville’s Cross, New Brancepeth and Ushaw Moor, Newton Hall North, Newton Hall South, Pelaw and Gilesgate, Pittington and West Rainton, St Nicholas, Shadforth and Sherburn, Shincliffe.

Darlington
Bank Top, Central, Cockerton East, Cockerton West, College, Eastbourne, Faverdale, Harrowgate Hill, Haughton East, Haughton North, Haughton West, Hummersknott, Lascelles, Lingfield, Mowden, Northgate, North Road, Park East, Park West, Pierremont.

Easington
Acre Rigg, Blackhalls, Dawdon, Dene House, Deneside, Easington Colliery, Easington Village and South Hetton, Eden Hill, Haswell and Shotton, Horden North, Horden South, Howletch, Hutton Henry, Murton East, Murton West, Passfield, Seaham Harbour, Seaham North.

Hartlepool
Brus, Burn Valley, Dyke House, Elwick, Fens, Foggy Furze, Grange, Greatham, Hart, Owton, Park, Rift House, Rossmere, St Hilda, Seaton, Stranton, Throston.

North Durham
Annfield Plain, Bournmoor, Catchgate, Chester Central, Chester East, Chester North, Chester South, Chester West, Craghead and South Stanley, Edmondsley and Waldridge, Grange Villa and West Pelton, Havannah, Kimblesworth and Plawsworth, Lumley, North Lodge, Ouston, Pelton, Pelton Fell, Sacriston, South Moor, Stanley Hall, Tanfield, Urpeth.

North West Durham
Benfieldside, Blackhill, Burnhope, Burnopfield, Castleside, Consett East, Consett North, Consett South, Cornsay, Crook North, Crook South, Delves Lane, Dipton, Ebchester and Medomsley, Esh, Howden, Hunwick, Lanchester, Leadgate, St John’s Chapel, Stanhope, Tow Law and Stanley, Wheatbottom and Helmington Row, Willington Central, Willington West End, Wolsingham and Witton-le-Wear.

Sedgefield
Bishop Middleham and Cornforth, Broom, Chilton, Ferryhill, Fishburn and Old Trimdon, Greenfield Middridge, Heighington and Coniscliffe, Hurworth, Middleton St George, Neville and Simpasture, New Trimdon and Trimdon Grange, Sadberge and Whessoe, Sedgefield, Shafto St Marys, Thornley and Wheatley Hill, West, Wingate, Woodham.

Stockton North
Billingham Central, Billingham East, Billingham North, Billingham South, Billingham West, Hardwick, Newtown, Northern Parishes, Norton North, Norton South, Norton West, Roseworth, Stockton Town Centre, Western Parishes.

Stockton South

Bishopsgarth and Elm Tree, Eaglescliffe, Fairfield, Grangefield, Hartburn, Parkfield-and-Oxbridge.

See also
List of parliamentary constituencies in County Durham

References

Politics of County Durham
Durham
Wards